Hackthorpe is a hamlet in the Eden district, in the county of Cumbria, England. Circa 1870, it had a population of 110 as recorded in the Imperial Gazetteer of England and Wales.

Location 
It is located on the A6 road just south of Lowther which the two settlements could be considered to be conjoined, and about four miles from the town of Penrith. It is close to the M6 motorway, but there is no access to Hackthorpe from the M6.

See also

Listed buildings in Lowther, Cumbria

References

External links
 Cumbria County History Trust: Lowther (nb: provisional research only – see Talk page)

Hamlets in Cumbria
Eden District